This is a list of flag bearers who have represented Belarus at the Olympics.

Flag bearers carry the national flag of their country at the opening ceremony of the Olympic Games.

See also
Belarus at the Olympics

References

Belarus at the Olympics
Belarus
Olympic